The W. D. Crawford House is a historic house in rural central Carroll County, Arkansas.  It is located on the east side of County Road 643, east of Berryville, near the small rural community of Cisco.  It is a two-story stone structure, with a hip roof that rises to a cupola at the peak.  The house was built c. 1900 by W. D. Crawford, a graduate of the law school of the University of Arkansas at Fayetteville, who used the building as a home and school until 1904, when he founded the Ozark Normal School at Green Forest.  Crawford would remain a constant presence in the educational systems of the region until his death in 1952.

The house was listed on the National Register of Historic Places in 1992.

See also
National Register of Historic Places listings in Carroll County, Arkansas

References

Houses on the National Register of Historic Places in Arkansas
Houses completed in 1900
Houses in Carroll County, Arkansas
National Register of Historic Places in Carroll County, Arkansas
1900 establishments in Arkansas